The QJS-161, also known as the QJB-201, is a Chinese light machine gun designed and manufactured by Norinco for the People's Liberation Army.

Design and development
The QJS-161 features two types of barrel varied in length, presumably for different requirements from the PLA Ground Force and the PLAAF Airborne Corps. As an open-bolt machine gun, the QJS-161 uses 5.8×42mm ammunition that can feed either from a disintegrating belt in fabric container loaded into the feed port on the left side of the weapon, or a standard Chinese 5.8×42mm box magazine inserted vertically into the magazine well at the bottom of the weapon, and the non-reciprocating charging handle is located on its right. A picatinny rail is located behind the short dust cover above the feeding port.

The squad automatic machine gun features weight reduction design, such as lightweight material for the body and detachable box magazine made of fabric, reducing the weight to less than  when empty. The side-folding stock features a fully adjustable buttpad and cheek rest.

Users
 : People's Liberation Army

See also
 QJY-201
 QBB-95
 QJY-88
 FN EVOLYS
 Heckler & Koch MG5
 IWI Negev
 M249 light machine gun
 RPL-20

References

5.8 mm firearms
Light machine guns
Machine guns of the People's Republic of China